In cricket, a five-wicket haul (also known as a "five–for" or "fifer") refers to a bowler taking five or more wickets in a single innings. This is regarded as a notable achievement, and  only 47 bowlers have taken at least 15 five-wicket hauls at international level in their cricketing careers. Mitchell Starc, an Australian cricketer has taken 22 five-wicket hauls in international cricket. A left-arm fast bowler, Starc has played 76 Tests, 108 One Day International (ODI) matches and 58 Twenty20 International (T20I) matches for his country, and has taken 305, 211 and 73 wickets respectively .

Starc made his Test debut against New Zealand at The Gabba, Brisbane on 1 December 2011. He took his first Test five-wicket haul against South Africa at the WACA Ground, Perth on 30 November 2012, taking 6/154. His best figures in Tests is 6/50, taken against Sri Lanka at the Galle International Stadium, Galle on 4 August 2016.

Starc made his One Day International (ODI) debut against India at the Dr. Y. S. Rajasekhara Reddy ACA–VDCA Cricket Stadium, Visakhapatnam on 20 October 2010. He took his first ODI five-wicket haul against Pakistan at the Sharjah Cricket Stadium, Sharjah on 28 August 2012, taking 5/42. His best figures of 6/28 in ODIs came against New Zealand on 28 February 2015 at Eden Park, Auckland.

Starc made his Twenty20 International (T20I) debut against Pakistan on 7 September 2012 at the Dubai International Cricket Stadium, Dubai. , he is yet to take a five-wicket haul in the format, with his best figures being 3/11, taken against the same opposition at the same ground in the following match of the series on 10 September 2012.

Key

Test five-wicket hauls

Test ten-wicket hauls

One Day Internationals

References

Starc
Starc, Mitchell